The 1919 Ohio Green and White football team represented Ohio University as a member of the Ohio Athletic Conference (OAC) during the 1919 college football season. Led by second-year head coach Frank Gullum, the Green and White compiled an overall record of 3–5 with a mark of 2–4 in conference play.

Schedule

References

Ohio
Ohio Bobcats football seasons
Ohio Green and White football